Days in December was a London-based post-hardcore band who released an EP entitled "Countless Hours Making Waves".

Biography

Formation
The band was formed in December 2002 (hence the name) in North West London, England. Debut single "Comfort In Surrounding Space" was released on CD in 2003, and several tours ensued. After numerous lineup changes the band's final incarnation included: Daniel Leigh (vocals), Phil Kinman (lead guitar), Robb Wybrow (guitar & vocals), Rob Turnbridge (bass guitar), and Frankie Torpey (drums).

Progression 
Days in December completed tours alongside Funeral for a Friend (whose drummer Ryan Richards contributed vocals to the track "Last Chance Before The Storm"), Bullet For My Valentine, SikTh, Beloved, Dead Poetic, and Armor for Sleep, as well performances on the 2005 Taste Of Chaos UK tour, at the 2006 "Full Ponty" festival, and at the National Adventure Sports Show. 

The band was acclaimed with "Single of the Week" in Kerrang magazine, for their EP "Countless Hours Making Waves", and undertook an interview for Iron Maiden's "Bruce Dickinson Radio Show" on BBC Radio 6 Music.

A mini-album called "Deleted Scenes" was released on 11 September 2006 on Deck Cheese Records. This release secured a second successive "KKKK" review in Kerrang! magazine.

Final tour 
Days In December toured the UK for the final time in the latter half of 2007, including farewell dates at: Cardiff Barfly, Camden Underworld and Southampton Joiners. The band marked their end with the closure of their website and an official announcement on MySpace.

Subsequent projects 
Daniel Leigh, Phil Kinman and Robb Wybrow formed the band New Device after Days in December split up. New Device went on to tour with Gun, Backyard Babies and Heaven's Basement, supported Bon Jovi at The O2 Arena (London) in 2010, and played at the Download Festival, Sonisphere Festival, Hard Rock Hell Festival, and the 2010 High Voltage Festival. 

Frontman Daniel Leigh has also worked on solo material, and has collaborated with Gun, Mark Morriss and Chris Difford. Leigh's debut solo E.P. "My Little Eye" was scheduled for release in early 2012.

Since leaving New Device, Phil Kinman has worked as a record producer on releases such as the 2012 album War Nation by the band Tank and The King and the Bishop by Deadly Circus Fire.

Final lineup 
Daniel Leigh – Vocals
Phil Kinman – Lead guitar
Robb Wybrow – Guitar, vocals
Rob Turnbridge – Bass guitar
Frankie Torpey – Drums

Discography

See also 
List of bands from England

English rock music groups